Ethan Havard (born 26 October 2000) is a professional rugby league footballer who plays as a  for the Wigan Warriors in the Betfred Super League.

Career
In 2019 he made his Super League début for Wigan against Wakefield Trinity.

Havard was charged with the Grade E offence of Eye Gouging for which he was sent off in the 79th minute of an Under-19s fixture against Newcastle Thunder. He denied the offence, and after appearing in front of an independent disciplinary, was found to be 'not guilty'.
On 28 May 2022, Havard played for Wigan in their 2022 Challenge Cup Final victory over Huddersfield.

International
Havard is elegible to represent Bulgaria by place of birth. However he declared for England in 2020 ahead of his first call up for the England Knights.

References

External links
Wigan Warriors profile
SL profile

2000 births
Living people
England Knights national rugby league team players
Rugby league props
Sportspeople from Sofia
Wigan Warriors players